The Battle of Froeschwiller (18–22 December 1793) saw Republican French armies led by Lazare Hoche and Charles Pichegru attack a Habsburg Austrian army commanded by Dagobert Sigmund von Wurmser. On the 18th, a French attack pushed back the Austrians a short distance. After more fighting, a powerful assault on the 22nd forced the entire Austrian army to withdraw to Wissembourg. The action occurred during the War of the First Coalition, part of the Wars of the French Revolution.

The Austrian victory in the First Battle of Wissembourg threatened to overrun the territory of Alsace. Hoche assumed command of the Army of the Moselle and attacked the Prussian army in the Battle of Kaiserslautern without success. However, the French took advantage of the lack of cooperation between the Prussians and their Austrian allies. Hoche sent 12,000 troops under Alexandre Camille Taponier through the Palatinate Forest to attack Wurmser's right flank at Froeschwiller. On 22 December, Hoche launched a successful assault with five divisions while Pichegru's Army of the Rhine attacked Wurmser from the south. The Second Battle of Wissembourg on 25–26 December would decide the fate of Alsace.

References

Battles of the War of the First Coalition
Battles of the French Revolutionary Wars
Battles involving Austria
Battles involving Prussia
Battles involving France
Battles in Grand Est
Conflicts in 1793